The Middle School Cadet Corps (MSCC) are cadet programs for middle school students in the United States. Per 2005, Chicago had 26 Middle School Cadet Corps enlisting more than 850 children, overseen by the JROTC program. Students from the age of 11 can participate in the program, or younger if they have older siblings in the program.

List of MSCCs
California Cadet Corps - includes students in the middle school and elementary grades.
Navy League Cadet Corps (NLCC) 
Young Marines
Civil Air Patrol
Leadership Officers Training Corps (LOTC)

NLCC
The NLCC (Navy League Cadet Corps) is a MSCC for youths between the ages of 11 and 13 under the United States Naval Sea Cadet Corps and the Navy League of the United States.

LOTC
A supporting organization known as the Leadership Officers Training Corps (LOTC) also exists as a precursor for JROTC for middle schools in Texas. The first program was created in April 1995 at Alice Johnson Junior High in Channelview under the direction of Colonel Chester T. Churrin. Today over 1,700 students are enrolled in the program in central Texas. LOTC, unlike its high school and college counterparts, does not receive federal funding.

See also
Junior Reserve Officers' Training Corps
Public military schools in the United States

References

American military youth groups